Lanistes nyassanus is a species of large freshwater snail, an aquatic gastropod mollusk with a gill and an operculum in the family Ampullariidae, the apple snails. The shell of this species is unusual in that it has left-handed shell-coiling.

The specific name nyassanus is derived from the type locality of the species, Lake Nyassa.

Distribution 
Lanistes nyassanus is found in Malawi and Mozambique. Found in sand and weeds, it is common at 1.5 meters depth, but some have been found as deep as 35 meters.

The type locality is the southern end of Lake Nyassa.

Description 
The width of the shell is 75 mm; the height of the shell is 68 mm.

Behavior 
These snails burrow into sand to hide from fish.

References

Ampullariidae
Gastropods described in 1865
Taxonomy articles created by Polbot